The California Scholarship Federation (CSF), started in 1921 by Charles F. Seymour, seeks to recognize students living in the state of California who possess high standards in academics.

Members of the California Scholarship Federation are eligible for a variety of tuition scholarships available at universities across the state and in select colleges nationwide. Regional subcommittees nominate several members as Life Members based upon character, leadership abilities and volunteer service. Fifty of these students receive $2,000 each, and five (one from each region of California) are awarded an additional $3000 toward their college tuition.

Approximately one thousand chapters are located in various secondary schools across the state. The organization continues to promote the education of academically motivated students, encouraging them to get involved in their communities through volunteer service.

CSF also has a subdivision called the California Junior Scholarship Federation which awards scholarships to middle school students.

Notable alumni
 David Hadley
 David J. Wineland

References

External links
California Scholarship Federation
CSF Facebook page

High school honor societies
Education in California
Organizations established in 1921
1921 establishments in California